

References

United States
Airlines, defunct
Airlines
Defunct